John Maland High School is located in Devon, Alberta, Canada.  It teaches students from Grade 10–12.  The current principal is Darren Caldwell.

External links
 John Maland High

High schools in Alberta
Educational institutions in Canada with year of establishment missing